Drög að Upprisu is an album released in 1994 by Icelandic singer Megas. Formed by 16 tracks, this work counted with the collaboration of guitarist Guðlaugur Kristinn Óttarsson.

Track listing

External links
Page about Megas at Tónlist.com - It features discography with mp3 samples.
Official site of Guðlaugur Kristinn Óttarsson
Page of G. K. Óttarsson at MySpace.com

1994 albums
Megas albums